Simon Hallenbarter (5 March 1979 – 3 October 2022) was a Swiss biathlete. He represented Switzerland at two Olympics – 2006 Winter Olympics and 2010 Winter Olympics. Hallenbarter finished 16th in the men's 10 kilometres sprint at the 2010 Olympics. He started to compete in biathlon in 2002.

Hallenbarter retired from the sport at the end of the 2013–14 season.

References

External links
 

1979 births
2022 deaths
2022 suicides
Swiss male biathletes
Biathletes at the 2006 Winter Olympics
Biathletes at the 2010 Winter Olympics
Biathletes at the 2014 Winter Olympics
Olympic biathletes of Switzerland
Sportspeople from Valais
People from Goms District